Baladjie Rock is a granite rock formation located approximately  north of Westonia and approximately  north west of Southern Cross in the eastern Wheatbelt region of Western Australia and is part of the Baladjie Lake Nature Reserve. The reserve is situated within the Great Western Woodlands and is adjacent to the southern edge of the Baladjie salt lake system.

The name of the rock is Aboriginal in origin but the meaning is not known. The spelling has been given as Balahgin, Baladgin, Balajie and Baladgee. The town of Baldjie that was established in 1928 took its name from the rock.

See also
Granite outcrops of Western Australia

References

Wheatbelt (Western Australia)
Rock formations of Western Australia
Great Western Woodlands